Johann Palisa (6 December 1848 – 2 May 1925) was an Austrian astronomer, born in Troppau, Austrian Silesia, now Czech Republic. He was a prolific discoverer of asteroids, discovering 122 in all, from 136 Austria in 1874 to 1073 Gellivara in 1923. Some of his notable discoveries include 153 Hilda, 216 Kleopatra, 243 Ida, 253 Mathilde, 324 Bamberga, and the near-Earth asteroid 719 Albert. Palisa made his discoveries without the aid of photography, and he remains the most successful visual (non-photographic) asteroid discoverer of all time. He was awarded the Valz Prize from the French Academy of Sciences in 1906. The asteroid 914 Palisana, discovered by Max Wolf in 1919, and the lunar crater Palisa were named in his honour.

Biography 

Palisa was born on 6 December 1848, in Troppau in Austrian Silesia (now called Opava and located in the Czech Republic). From 1866 to 1870, Palisa studied mathematics and astronomy at the University of Vienna; however, he did not graduate until 1884. Despite this, by 1870 he was an assistant at the University's observatory, and a year later gained a position at the observatory in Geneva. A few years later, in 1872, at the age of 24, Palisa became the director of the Austrian Naval Observatory in Pula. While at Pula, he discovered his first asteroid, 136 Austria, on 18 March 1874. Along with this, he discovered twenty-seven minor planets and one comet. During his stay in Pula he used a small six-inch refractor telescope to aid in his research.

Palisa became director of the Pula observatory, with the rank of commander, until 1880. In 1880 Palisa moved to the new Vienna Observatory. While at the observatory he discovered 94 comets by visual means.

In 1883 he joined a French expedition to Caroline Island to observe the Solar eclipse of 6 May 1883. During the expedition, he joined to observations for the search for the hypothetical planet  Vulcan, as well as collecting samples of insects for the Vienna Museum of Natural History. In memory of this expedition, he named the asteroid 235 Carolina after Caroline Island.

In 1885, Palisa offered to sell the naming rights of some of the minor planets he discovered, in order to fund his travels to observe the Solar eclipse of 29 August 1886. However he sold just a small number of these naming rights and apparently did not go.

Palisa and Max Wolf worked together to create the first star atlas created by photographic plates, the Palisa–Wolf Sternkarten, published in 1899, 1902, 1908. In 1908, Palisa published the Sternenlexikon, mapping the skies from declinations −1° to +19°. That same year, he became the vice director of the Vienna Observatory. He retired from administrative duties in 1919, but kept observation rights. Palisa continued to discover asteroids until 1923. He died on 2 May 1925.

Discoveries 

Between 1874 and 1923 Palisa discovered 122 asteroids ranging from 136 Austria to 1073 Gellivara and the much later numbered Mars-crosser 14309 Defoy, respectively (see table below). He made his discoveries at the Austrian Naval Observatory at Pola  and at the Vienna Observatory. He also discovered the parabolic comet C/1879 Q1 in August 1879.

One of his discoveries was 253 Mathilde, a 50-kilometer sized C-type asteroid in the intermediate asteroid belt, which was visited by the NEAR Shoemaker spacecraft on 27 June 1997. The robotic probe passed within 1200 km of Mathilde at 12:56 UT at 9.93 km/s, returning imaging and other instrument data including over 500 images which covered 60% of Mathilde's surface. Only a small number of minor planets have been visited by spacecraft.

Palisa made all of his asteroid discoveries visually. Even though Max Wolf had revolutionised the process of asteroid discovery by introducing photography in the 1890s, Palisa continued to trust on visual observations. His final discovery, 1073 Gellivara, was the last asteroid that was found visually. Johann Palisa remains the most successful visual (non-photographic) asteroid discoverer of all time.

Family

Palisa married his second wife, Anna Benda, in 1902. Asteroid 734 Benda is named after her. He also named minor planets after other members of his family: 320 Katharina after his mother, Katherina, 321 Florentina for his daughter Florentine.

His granddaughter was Gertrud Rheden, wife of astronomer Joseph Rheden. Asteroid 710 Gertrud is named after her.

Honors and awards 

In 1876 Palisa was awarded the Lalande Prize.
 
Palisa was awarded the Valz Prize from the French Academy of Sciences in 1906.

The Phocaea main-belt asteroid 914 Palisana, discovered by Max Wolf in 1919, and the lunar crater Palisa were named in his honour.
Minor planets 902 Probitas, 975 Perseverantia, and 996 Hilaritas that he discovered were given names after his death for traits qualities associated with him: adherence to the highest principles and ideals, perseverance and happy or contented mind. Names were given by Joseph Rheden with the support of Palisa's second wife, Anna.

Minor planet 1152 Pawona is named after both Johann Palisa and Max Wolf, in recognition of their cooperation. The name was proposed by Swedish astronomer Bror Ansgar Asplind. Pawona is a combination of "Palisa" and "Wolf" (Pa, Wo) joined with a Latin feminine suffix.

References

External links 
 Portraits of Johann Palisa from the Lick Observatory Records Digital Archive, UC Santa Cruz Library's Digital Collections

Obituaries 
 

1848 births
1925 deaths
19th-century Austrian astronomers
Discoverers of asteroids
Discoverers of comets
People from Austrian Silesia
People from Opava
University of Vienna alumni
Recipients of the Lalande Prize
20th-century Austrian astronomers